This article is about the phonology and phonetics of the Spanish language. Unless otherwise noted, statements refer to Castilian Spanish, the standard dialect used in Spain on radio and television. For historical development of the sound system see History of Spanish.  For details of geographical variation see Spanish dialects and varieties.

Phonemes are written inside slashes and allophones inside brackets.

Consonants

(In one region of Spain, the area around Madrid, word-final  is sometimes pronounced  especially in a colloquial pronunciation of its name, Madriz.)

The phoneme  is realized as an approximant  in all contexts except after a pause, a nasal, or a lateral. In these environments, it may be realized as an affricate. The approximant allophone differs from non-syllabic  in a number of ways; it has a lower F2 amplitude, is longer, can only appear in the syllable onset (including word-initially, where non-syllabic  normally never appears), is a fricative  in emphatic pronunciations, and is unspecified for rounding (e.g. viuda  'widow' vs ayuda  'help'). The two also overlap in distribution after  and : enyesar  ('to plaster') aniego  ('flood'). Although there is dialectal and ideolectal variation, speakers may also exhibit other near-minimal pairs like abyecto ('abject') vs abierto ('opened').

In a number of varieties, including some American ones, a process parallel to the one distinguishing non-syllabic  from consonantal  occurs for non-syllabic  and a rare consonantal . Near-minimal pairs include deshuesar  ('to debone') vs. desuello  ('skinning'), son huevos  ('they are eggs') vs son nuevos  ('they are new'), and huaca  ('Indian grave') vs u oca  ('or goose').

Many young Argentinians have no distinct  phoneme and use the  sequence instead, thus making no distinction between huraño and uranio (both ).

The phoneme  (as distinct from ) is found in some areas in Spain (mostly northern and rural) and some areas of South America (mostly highlands).

However, speakers in parts of southern Spain, the Canary Islands, and nearly all of Latin America have only  (seseo). Some speakers in southernmost Spain (especially coastal Andalusia) have only  (a consonant similar to ) and not  (ceceo). This "ceceo" is not entirely unknown in the Americas, especially in coastal Peru. The phoneme  has three different pronunciations ("laminal s", "apical s" or "apical dental s") depending on dialect.

The phoneme  becomes dental  before denti-alveolar consonants, while  remains interdental  in all contexts.

Before front vowels , the velar consonants  (including the lenited allophone of ) are realized as post-palatal .

According to some authors,  is post-velar or uvular in the Spanish of northern and central Spain.

In native Spanish words, the trilled  does not appear after a glide.

In a number of dialects (most notably, Northern Mexican Spanish, informal Chilean Spanish, and some Caribbean and Andalusian accents)  occurs, as a deaffricated .

Consonant neutralizations
Some of the phonemic contrasts between consonants in Spanish are lost in certain phonological environments, and especially in syllable-final position. In these cases the phonemic contrast is said to be neutralized.

Sonorants

Nasals and laterals
The three nasal phonemes—, and —maintain their contrast when in syllable-initial position (e.g. cama 'bed', cana 'grey hair', caña 'sugar cane'). In syllable-final position, this three-way contrast is lost as nasals assimilate to the place of articulation of the following consonant—even across a word boundary; or, if a nasal is followed by a pause rather than a consonant, it is realized for most speakers as alveolar  (though in Caribbean varieties, this may instead be  or an omitted nasal with nasalization of the preceding vowel). Thus  is realized as  before labial consonants, and as  before velar ones.

Similarly,  assimilates to the place of articulation of a following coronal consonant, i.e. a consonant that is interdental, dental, alveolar, or palatal.

Rhotics
The alveolar trill  and the alveolar flap  are in phonemic contrast word-internally between vowels (as in carro 'car' vs caro 'expensive'), but are otherwise in complementary distribution, as long as syllable division is taken into account: the tap occurs after any syllable-initial consonant, while the trill occurs after any syllable-final consonant.

Only the tap can occur after a word-initial obstruent consonant (e.g. tres 'three', frío 'cold').

For example, the words subrayar, ciudadrealeño, postromántico have a trill. Each of these words has a morpheme boundary coinciding with the syllable division before the rhotic consonant; the trills correspond to the word-initial trills found in raya 'line',  Ciudad Real "Ciudad Real", and romántico "Romantic".
The tap is found in words where there is no syllable boundary between the obstruent and the following rhotic consonant, such as sobre 'over', madre 'mother', ministro 'minister'.

In word-final position the rhotic is usually:
 either a tap or a trill when followed by a consonant or a pause, as in amo paterno ('paternal love'), the former being more common;
 a tap when followed by a vowel-initial word, as in amo eterno ('eternal love').

Morphologically, a word-final rhotic always corresponds to the tapped  in related words.

When two rhotics occur consecutively across a word or prefix boundary, they result in one trill, so that da rocas ('s/he gives rocks') and dar rocas ('to give rocks') are either neutralized, or distinguished by a longer trill in the latter phrase.

The tap/trill alternation has prompted a number of authors to postulate a single underlying rhotic; the intervocalic contrast then results from gemination (e.g. tierra  >  'earth').

Obstruents

Both in casual and in formal speech, there is no phonemic contrast between voiced and voiceless consonants placed in syllable-final position. The merged phoneme is typically pronounced as a relaxed, voiced fricative or approximant, although a variety of other realizations are also possible. So the clusters -bt- and -pt- in the words obtener and optimista are pronounced exactly the same way:
 obtener 
 optimista 
Similarly, the spellings -dm- and -tm- are often merged in pronunciation, as well as -gd- and -cd-:
 adminículo  
 atmosférico  
 amígdala  
 anécdota

Vowels

There is no phonemic distinction between the close-mid and open-mid vowels that is found in Catalan, French, Italian and Portuguese. The diphthongal  regularly correspond to the open  in Portuguese cognates; compare siete  'seven' and fuerte  'strong' with the Portuguese cognates sete  and forte , meaning the same.

Each of the five vowels in both stressed and unstressed syllables:

Nevertheless, there are some distributional gaps or rarities. For instance, an unstressed close vowel in the final syllable of a word is rare.

Both of those features are viewed as strongly non-standard by other speakers.

Allophones
Phonetic nasalization occurs for vowels occurring between nasal consonants or when preceding a syllable-final nasal, e.g. cinco  ('five') and mano  ('hand').

Arguably, Eastern Andalusian and Murcian Spanish have ten phonemic vowels, with each of the above vowels paired by a lowered or fronted and lengthened version, e.g. la madre  ('the mother') vs. las madres  ('the mothers').  However, these are more commonly analyzed as allophones triggered by an underlying  that is subsequently deleted.

Exact number of allophones
There is no agreement among scholars on how many vowel allophones Spanish has; an often postulated number is five .

Some scholars, however, state that Spanish has eleven allophones: the close and mid vowels have close  and open  allophones, whereas  appears in front , central  and back  variants. These symbols appear only in the narrowest variant of phonetic transcription; in broader variants, only the symbols  are used, and that is the convention adopted in the rest of this article.

Tomás Navarro Tomás describes the distribution of said eleven allophones as follows:

 Close vowels 
 The close allophones  appear in open syllables, e.g. in the words libre  'free' and subir  'to raise'
 The open allophones are phonetically near-close , and appear:
 In closed syllables, e.g. in the word fin  'end'
 In both open and closed syllables when before , e.g. in the words hijo  'son' and pujó  's/he bid'
 Mid front vowel 
 The close allophone is phonetically close-mid , and appears:
 In open syllables, e.g. in the word dedo  'finger'
 In closed syllables when before , e.g. in the word Valencia  'Valencia'
 The open allophone is phonetically open-mid , and appears:
 In the diphthong , e.g. in the words peine  'comb' and rey   king
 Mid back vowel 
 The close allophone is phonetically close-mid , and appears in open syllables, e.g. in the word como  'how'
 The open allophone is phonetically open-mid , and appears:
 In closed syllables, e.g. in the word con  'with'
 In both open and closed syllables when before , e.g. in the word ojo  'eye'
 In the diphthong , e.g. in the word hoy  'today'
 Open vowel 
 The front allophone  appears:
 Before palatal consonants, e.g. in the word despacho  'office'
 In the diphthong , e.g. in the word aire  'air'
 The back allophone  appears:
 Before the back vowels , e.g. in the word flauta  'flute'
 In closed syllables before , e.g. in the word sal  'salt'
 In both open and closed syllables when before , e.g. in the word tajada  'chop'
 The central allophone  appears in all other cases, e.g. in the word casa 

According to Eugenio Martínez Celdrán, however, systematic classification of Spanish allophones is impossible due to the fact that their occurrence varies from speaker to speaker and from region to region. According to him, the exact degree of openness of Spanish vowels depends not so much on the phonetic environment, but rather on various external factors accompanying speech.

Diphthongs and triphthongs

Spanish has six falling diphthongs and eight rising diphthongs. While many diphthongs are historically the result of a recategorization of vowel sequences (hiatus) as diphthongs, there is still lexical contrast between diphthongs and hiatus.

In the case of verbs like  ('relieve'), diphthongs result from the suffixation of normal verbal morphology onto a stem-final  (that is,  would be || + ||).

'right away'). The frequency (though not the presence) of this phenomenon differs amongst dialects, with a number having it occur rarely and others exhibiting it always.

Prosody
Spanish is usually considered a syllable-timed language. Even so, stressed syllables can be up to 50% longer in duration than non-stressed syllables. Although pitch, duration, and loudness contribute to the perception of stress, pitch is the most important in isolation.

Primary stress occurs on the penultima (the next-to-last syllable) 80% of the time. The other 20% of the time, stress falls on the ultima and antepenultima (third-to-last syllable).

Nonverbs are generally stressed on the penultimate syllable for vowel-final words and on the final syllable of consonant-final words. Exceptions are marked orthographically (see below), whereas regular words are underlyingly phonologically marked with a stress feature [+stress].

In addition to exceptions to these tendencies, particularly learned words from Greek and Latin that feature antepenultimate stress, there are numerous minimal pairs which contrast solely on stress such as sábana ('sheet') and sabana ('savannah'), as well as límite ('boundary'), limite ('[that] he/she limit') and limité ('I limited').

Lexical stress may be marked orthographically with an acute accent (ácido, distinción, etc.).  This is done according to the mandatory stress rules of Spanish orthography, which are similar to the tendencies above (differing with words like distinción) and are defined so as to unequivocally indicate where the stress lies in a given written word.  An acute accent may also be used to differentiate homophones, such as mi (my), and mí (me). In such cases, the accent is used on the homophone that normally receives greater stress when used in a sentence.

Lexical stress patterns are different between words carrying verbal and nominal inflection: in addition to the occurrence of verbal affixes with stress (something absent in nominal inflection), underlying stress also differs in that it falls on the last syllable of the inflectional stem in verbal words while those of nominal words may have ultimate or penultimate stress.  In addition, amongst sequences of clitics suffixed to a verb, the rightmost clitic may receive secondary stress, e.g. búscalo  ('look for it').

Alternations
A number of alternations exist in Spanish that reflect diachronic changes in the language and arguably reflect morphophonological processes rather than strictly phonological ones.

Likewise, in a very small number of words, alternations occur between the palatal sonorants  and their corresponding alveolar sonorants  (doncella/doncel 'maiden'/'youth', desdeñar/desdén 'to scorn'/'scorn'). This alternation does not appear in verbal or nominal inflection (that is, the plural of doncel is donceles, not *doncelles). Words without any palatal-alveolar allomorphy are the result of historical borrowings.

Other alternations include  ~  (anexo vs anejo),  ~  (nocturno vs noche).

There are also pairs that show antepenultimate stress in nouns and adjectives but penultimate stress in synonymous verbs (vómito 'vomit' vs. vomito 'I vomit').

Phonotactics

Spanish syllable structure can be summarized as follows; parentheses enclose optional components:
 (C1 (C2)) (S1) V (S2) (C3 (C4))

Spanish syllable structure consists of an optional syllable onset, consisting of one or two consonants; an obligatory syllable nucleus, consisting of a vowel optionally preceded by and/or followed by a semivowel; and an optional syllable coda, consisting of one or two consonants. The following restrictions apply:

 Onset
 First consonant (C1): Can be any consonant, including a liquid.
The onset  is nonexistent.  is prohibited as an onset cluster in most of Peninsular Spanish, while  sequences such as in  'athlete' are usually treated as an onset cluster in Latin America and the Canaries.
 Nucleus
 Semivowel (S1)
 Vowel (V)
 Semivowel (S2)
 Coda
 Second consonant (C4): Always  in native Spanish words. A coda of two consonants never appears in words inherited from Vulgar Latin.
 Medial codas assimilate place features of the following onsets and are often stressed.

Maximal onsets include transporte , flaco , clave .

Maximal nuclei include buey , Uruguay .

Maximal codas include instalar , perspectiva .

In many dialects, a coda cannot be more than one consonant (one of n, r, l or s) in informal speech.

Epenthesis 
The epenthetic  is pronounced even when it is not reflected in spelling (e.g. the surname of Carlos Slim is pronounced ). While Spanish words undergo word-initial epenthesis, cognates in Latin and Italian do not:

 Lat. status  ('state') ~ It. stato  ~ Sp. estado 
 Lat. splendidus  ('splendid') ~ It. splendido  ~ Sp. espléndido 
 Fr. slave  ('Slav') ~ It. slavo  ~ Sp. eslavo 

In addition, Spanish adopts foreign words starting with pre-nasalized consonants with an epenthetic .

When adapting word-final complex codas that show rising sonority, an epenthetic  is inserted between the two consonants. For example,  is typically pronounced .

Assimilated borrowings usually delete the first element in such clusters, for example  'psychology'. When attempting to pronounce such words for the first time without deleting the first consonant, Spanish speakers insert a short, often devoiced, schwa-like svarabhakti vowel between the two consonants.

Spanish syllable structure is phrasal, resulting in syllables consisting of phonemes from neighboring words in combination, sometimes even resulting in elision. The phenomenon is known in Spanish as enlace.  For a brief discussion contrasting Spanish and English syllable structure, see .

Acquisition as a first language

Phonology
Phonological development varies greatly by individual, both those developing regularly and those with delays. However, a general pattern of acquisition of phonemes can be inferred by the level of complexity of their features, i.e. by sound classes. A hierarchy may be constructed, and if a child is capable of producing a discrimination on one level, they will also be capable of making the discriminations of all prior levels.

 The first level consists of stops (without a voicing distinction), nasals, and optionally, a non-lateral approximant. This includes a labial/coronal place difference (for example,  vs  and  vs ).
 The second level includes voicing distinction for oral stops and a coronal/dorsal place difference.
 The third level includes fricatives and/or affricates.
It also introduces .
 The fifth level introduces the trill .

This hierarchy is based on production only, and is a representation of a child's capacity to produce a sound, whether that sound is the correct target in adult speech or not. Thus, it may contain some sounds that are not included in the adult phonology, but produced as a result of error.

Spanish-speaking children will accurately produce most segments at a relatively early age. By around three-and-a-half years, they will no longer productively use phonological processes the majority of the time. Some common error patterns (found 10% or more of the time) are cluster reduction, liquid simplification, and stopping. Less common patterns (evidenced less than 10% of the time) include palatal fronting, assimilation, and final consonant deletion.

(In comparison, English-learning children are able to produce adult-like voicing contrasts for these stops well before age three.)

The alveolar trill  is one of the most difficult sounds to be produced in Spanish and as a result is acquired later in development. Research suggests that the alveolar trill is acquired and developed between the ages of three and six years. Some children acquire an adult-like trill within this period and some fail to properly acquire the trill.  The attempted trill sound of the poor trillers is often perceived as a series of taps owing to hyperactive tongue movement during production.

The trill is also very difficult for those learning Spanish as a second language, sometimes taking over a year to produce properly.

Codas
One research study found that children acquire medial codas before final codas, and stressed codas before unstressed codas. Since medial codas are often stressed and must undergo place assimilation, greater importance is accorded to their acquisition. Liquid and nasal codas occur word-medially and at the ends of frequently used function words, so they are often acquired first.

Prosody
Research suggests that children overgeneralize stress rules when they are reproducing novel Spanish words and that they have a tendency to stress the penultimate syllables of antepenultimately stressed words, to avoid a violation of nonverb stress rules that they have acquired. Many of the most frequent words heard by children have irregular stress patterns or are verbs, which violate nonverb stress rules. This complicates stress rules until ages three to four, when stress acquisition is essentially complete, and children begin to apply these rules to novel irregular situations.

Dialectal variation
Some features, such as the pronunciation of voiceless stops , have no dialectal variation. However, there are numerous other features of pronunciation that differ from dialect to dialect.

Yeísmo

One notable dialectal feature is the merging of the voiced palatal approximant  (as in ayer) with the palatal lateral approximant  (as in calle) into one phoneme (yeísmo), with  losing its laterality. While the distinction between these two sounds has traditionally been a feature of Castilian Spanish, this merger has spread throughout most of Spain in recent generations, particularly outside of regions in close linguistic contact with Catalan and Basque. In Spanish America, most dialects are characterized by this merger, with the distinction persisting mostly in parts of Peru, Bolivia, Paraguay, and northwestern Argentina.

Seseo, ceceo and distinción

However, speakers in Latin America, Canary Islands and some parts of southern Spain have only  (seseo), which in southernmost Spain is pronounced  and not  (ceceo).

Realization of 
The phoneme  has three different pronunciations depending on the dialect area:
 An  alveolar retracted fricative (or "apico-alveolar" fricative)  sounds a bit like English  and is characteristic of the northern and central parts of Spain and is also used by many speakers in Colombia's Antioquia department.
 A  alveolar grooved fricative , much like the most common pronunciation of English , is characteristic of western Andalusia (e.g. Málaga, Seville, and Cádiz), Canary Islands, and Latin America.
It occurs only in dialects with ceceo, mostly in Granada, in parts of Jaén, in the southern part of Sevilla and the mountainous areas shared between Cádiz and Málaga.

Obaid describes the apico-alveolar sound as follows:

Dalbor describes the apico-dental sound as follows:

In some dialects,  may become the approximant  in the syllable coda (e.g. doscientos  'two hundred'). In Spain, this was originally a southern feature, but it is now expanding rapidly to the north.

From an autosegmental point of view, the  phoneme in Madrid is defined only by its voiceless and fricative features. Thus, the point of articulation is not defined and is determined from the sounds following it in the word or sentence. In Madrid, the following realizations are found:  >  and  > . In Eastern Andalusian and Murcian Spanish, word-final ,  and  regularly weaken, and the preceding vowel is lowered and lengthened:
  >  e.g. mis  ('my' pl)
  >  e.g. mes  ('month')
  >  e.g. más  ('plus')
  >  e.g. tos  ('cough')
  >  e.g. tus  ('your' pl)

Coda simplification
Southern European Spanish (Andalusian Spanish, Murcian Spanish, etc.) and several lowland dialects in Latin America (such as those from the Caribbean, Panama, and the Atlantic coast of Colombia) exhibit more extreme forms of simplification of coda consonants:
 word-final dropping of nasals with nasalization of the preceding vowel (e.g. ven  'come')
  in the infinitival morpheme (e.g. comer  'to eat')
 the occasional dropping of coda consonants word-internally (e.g. doctor  'doctor').
The dropped consonants appear when additional suffixation occurs (e.g. compases  'beats', venían  'they were coming', comeremos  'we will eat'). Similarly, a number of coda assimilations occur:
Andalusian Spanish alma/arma ) or, by complete regressive assimilation, to a copy of the following consonant (e.g. pulga/purga  'flea'/'purge', carne  'meat').
 Stops and nasals may be realized as velar (e.g. Cuban and Venezuelan étnico  'ethnic', himno  'anthem').

Final  dropping (e.g. mitad  'half') is general in most dialects of Spanish, even in formal speech.

Pepsi being pronounced ). It does not face as much stigma as other neutralizations, and may go unnoticed.

The deletions and neutralizations show variability in their occurrence, even with the same speaker in the same utterance, so nondeleted forms exist in the underlying structure. The dialects may not be on the path to eliminating coda consonants since deletion processes have been existing for more than four centuries.   argues that it is the result of speakers acquiring multiple phonological systems with uneven control like that of second language learners.

However, word-final  is rare, and  even more so. They are restricted mostly to loanwords and foreign names, such as the first name of former Real Madrid sports director Predrag Mijatović, which is pronounced ; and after another consonant, the voiced obstruent may even be deleted, as in iceberg, pronounced . In Madrid and its environs, sed is alternatively pronunced , where the aforementioned alternative pronunciation of word-final  as  coexists with the standard realization, but is otherwise nonstandard.

Loan sounds
The fricative  may also appear in borrowings from other languages, such as Nahuatl and English.  In addition, the affricates  and  also occur in Nahuatl borrowings. That said, the onset cluster  is permitted in most of Latin America, the Canaries, and the northwest of Spain, and the fact that it is pronounced in the same amount of time as the other voiceless stop + lateral clusters  and  support an analysis of the  sequence as a cluster rather than an affricate in Mexican Spanish.

Sample

This sample is an adaptation of Aesop's "El Viento del Norte y el Sol" (The North Wind and the Sun) read by a man from Northern Mexico born in the late 1980s.

Orthographic version
El Viento del Norte y el Sol discutían por saber quién era el más fuerte de los dos. Mientras discutían, se acercó un viajero cubierto en un cálido abrigo. Entonces decidieron que el más fuerte sería quien lograse despojar al viajero de su abrigo. El Viento del Norte empezó, soplando tan fuerte como podía, pero entre más fuerte soplaba, el viajero más se arropaba. Entonces, el Viento desistió. Se llegó el turno del Sol, quien comenzó a brillar con fuerza. Esto hizo que el viajero sintiera calor y por ello se quitó su abrigo. Entonces el Viento del Norte tuvo que reconocer que el Sol era el más fuerte de los dos.

Phonemic transcription

Phonetic transcription

See also
 History of the Spanish language
 List of phonetics topics
 Spanish dialects and varieties
 Stress in Spanish

Notes

References

Further reading

External links
 Handbook of the International Phonetic Association: Castilian Spanish – audio samples

 
Phonology